Tre Harbison III (born July 1, 1998) is an American football running back who is a free agent. He played college football at Charlotte and was signed as an undrafted free agent by the Browns after the 2021 NFL Draft.

College career
Harbison was ranked as a threestar recruit by 247Sports.com coming out of high school. He committed to Virginia on April 12, 2015. After only one semester at Virginia, Harbison surprisingly decided to transfer from Virginia. He committed to Northern Illinois shortly thereafter. Harbison played three years at Northern Illinois before entering the transfer portal again on November 26, 2019. He committed to Charlotte on December 8, 2019.

Professional career
Harbison was signed as an undrafted free agent by the Cleveland Browns on May 3, 2021, where he reunited with college teammate Romeo McKnight. He was waived/injured on August 6, 2021 and placed on injured reserve. He was released on May 13, 2022.

Personal life 
His uncle Charlie Harbison, half-brother Devin Baldwin, and father James each played football at Gardner–Webb University.

References

External links
Charlotte bio

1998 births
Living people
Charlotte 49ers football players
Cleveland Browns players
Northern Illinois Huskies football players
People from Shelby, North Carolina
Players of American football from North Carolina
Virginia Cavaliers football players